Pardon Our Nerve is a 1939 American comedy film directed by H. Bruce Humberstone and written by Robert Ellis and Helen Logan. The film stars Lynn Bari, June Gale, Guinn "Big Boy" Williams, Michael Whalen, Edward Brophy and John Miljan. The film was released on February 24, 1939, by 20th Century Fox.

Plot

Cast      
Lynn Bari as Terry Wilson
June Gale as Judy Davis
Guinn "Big Boy" Williams as Samson Smith 
Michael Whalen as Dick Malone
Edward Brophy as Nosey Nelson
John Miljan as Duke Page
Theodore von Eltz as Lucky Carson
Ward Bond as Kid Ramsey
Chester Clute as Mr. Flemingwell
Helen Ericson as Arabella
Tom Kennedy as Bodyguard
Ray Walker as Publicity Man

References

External links 
 

1939 films
1930s English-language films
20th Century Fox films
American comedy films
1939 comedy films
Films directed by H. Bruce Humberstone
American black-and-white films
Films produced by Sol M. Wurtzel
1930s American films